Nuala O'Faolain (1 March 19409 May 2008) was an Irish journalist, TV producer, book reviewer, teacher and writer. She became well known after the publication of her memoirs Are You Somebody? and Almost There. She wrote a biography of Irish criminal Chicago May and two novels.

Personal life
O'Faolain was born in Clontarf, Dublin, the second eldest of nine children. Her father, known as 'TerryO' was a well-known Irish journalist, writing the "Dubliners Diary" social column under the pen name Terry O'Sullivan for the Dublin Evening Press. She was educated at University College Dublin, the University of Hull, and Oxford University. She taught for a time at Morley College, and worked as a television producer for the BBC and Raidió Teilifís Éireann.

O'Faolain described her early life as growing up in a Catholic country which in her view feared sexuality and forbade her even information about her body. In her writings she often discusses her frustration at the sexism and rigidity of roles in Catholic Ireland that expected her to marry and have children, neither of which she did.

O'Faolain was engaged at least once, but she never married.  In Are You Somebody?, she speaks candidly about her fifteen-year relationship with the journalist Nell McCafferty, who published her own memoir, Nell. From 2002 until her death, O'Faolain lived much of the time with Brooklyn-based attorney John Low-Beer and his daughter Anna.  They were registered as domestic partners in 2003.

O'Faolain split her time between Ireland and New York City. She had been diagnosed with metastatic cancer and was interviewed on the Marian Finucane radio show on RTÉ Radio 1 on 12 April 2008 in relation to her terminal illness.
 She told Finucane, "I don't want more time. As soon as I heard I was going to die, the goodness went from life".

O'Faolain died during the night on 9 May 2008. In 2012, RTÉ announced a major new documentary on her life.

Work
She became internationally well known for her two volumes of memoir, Are You Somebody? and Almost There; a novel, My Dream of You; and a history with commentary, The Story of Chicago May.  The first three were all featured on The New York Times Best Seller list. Her posthumous novel Best Love, Rosie was published in 2009.

O'Faolain's formative years coincided with the emergence of the women's movement, and her ability to expose misogyny in all its forms was formidable, forensic and unremitting. However, O'Faolain's feminism stemmed from a fundamental belief in social justice. Unlike most commentators, who maintain a detached, lofty tone, O'Faolain, placed herself at the centre of things, a high-risk strategy that worked because of her broad range of erudition, worn lightly, her courage and a truthfulness that sometimes bordered on the self-destructive.

Awards
 1985: Jacob's Award as producer of RTÉ television programme Plain Tales
 2006: Prix Femina étranger, The Story of Chicago May

Books
Are You Somebody? The Accidental Memoir of a Dublin Woman, New York: Henry Holt and Company, 1996. 
My Dream of You, Riverhead Books, 2001. 
Almost There:  The Onward Journey of a Dublin Woman, Riverhead Books, 2003. 
The Story of Chicago May, Riverhead Books, 2005. 
Best Love, Rosie, New Island Books, 2009. 
A More Complex Truth, New Island Books, 2010. , reprinted as A Radiant Life: The Selected Journalism of Nuala O’Faolain,  Harry N. Abrams 2011.

Further reading
Brady, Deirdre. (2005). Thank you for the days. Dublin: TownHouse.

References

External links
 Author Profile: Nuala O'Faolain, Bookreporter.com.
 NPR interview with Nuala O'Faolain, 14 March 2001.
 CBC radio interview: Nuala O'Faolain, 2003.
 Recording of 'The times that were in it'  2007 Michael Hartnett, Memorial lecture by Nuala O'Faolain.

1940 births
2008 deaths
Jacob's Award winners
People from County Dublin
Prix Femina Étranger winners
Irish women journalists
Irish women novelists
Irish women memoirists
Bisexual women
Bisexual memoirists
Bisexual journalists
Bisexual novelists
Irish bisexual people
Irish LGBT journalists
Irish LGBT novelists
20th-century Irish novelists
20th-century Irish women writers
20th-century memoirists
Deaths from cancer in the Republic of Ireland
20th-century Irish LGBT people
21st-century Irish LGBT people